The Trinidad and Tobago Cycling Federation is the national governing body of cycling racing in Trinidad and Tobago.

It is a member of Union Cycliste Internationale and Confederación Panamericana de Ciclismo.

See also
 Arima Velodrome
 Tobago Cycling Classic
 Trinidad and Tobago records in track cycling

External links
 Cycling at the Team TTO official website

National members of the Pan American Cycling Confederation
Cycle racing organizations
Cycle racing in Trinidad and Tobago
Cycling